The Drinky Crow Show is  an American adult computer-animated cel-shaded animated television series created by Eric Kaplan and Tony Millionaire, based on the latter's comic strip Maakies. The pilot episode aired on Adult Swim on May 13, 2007. The series premiered on November 23, 2008 and ended its run on January 25, 2009. The cancellation of the show was confirmed by a Maakies comic.

Dino Stamatopoulos provided the voice of the title character and David Herman the voices of Uncle Gabby and Captain Maak. Millionaire's then-wife Becky Thyre co-starred as the voice of the Captain's Daughter and Phoebe Bird. Pamela Adlon provided the voice of Mademoiselle DeBoursay, as well as many of the other female characters. Creators Tony Millionaire and Eric Kaplan also provided additional voices. They Might Be Giants perform the show's theme song.

Setting
The show centers on Drinky Crow (an often drunk crow) and Uncle Gabby described as a drunken Irish monkey. It has a 19th-century nautical setting, where the main characters are constantly at war with the French, who are mostly alligators. It is characterized by graphic violence and surreal humor, so it normally is rated TV-MA-V for graphic violence.

Production
The animation is done CGI-animated by Mirari Films's facilities in Brasov using Maya, its resolution and its color palette are deliberately kept low. This gives the show a more traditional cel-animated look, reminiscent of 1950s children's TV cartoon shows.

Characters
 Drinky Crow (Dino Stamatopoulos) - A desperate, depressed, tormented, romantic, suicidal, alcoholic crow.
 Uncle Gabby (David Herman) - A self-centered, stubborn, overweight Irish monkey who is only after girls and booze. He tends to only think of himself and sometimes tries to manipulate Drinky Crow.
 Phoebe Bird (Becky Thyre) - Drinky Crow's on-again, off-again, long-suffering sober seagull girlfriend. She used to date a walrus, but lost interest with him as he kept bringing his work home.
 Captain Maak (David Herman) - The brutal, lash-wielding captain of the boat Drinky Crow and Uncle Gabby work on. He is an American who does not care much for Uncle Gabby. He will only allow homosexuals near his daughter.
 Captain's Daughter (Becky Thyre) - A flirtatious, barefooted, sadistic, Betty Boop-style character who, like her title says, is the captain's daughter. Her real name is never given and the characters refer to her as "Captain's Daughter" (which is likely her real name). Her hobbies include never bathing and flossing her teeth while taking dumps.
 Lieutenant Vronchy (Dino Stamatopoulos) - An evil alligator who also is a naval captain for France.
 Mademoiselle DeBoursay (Pamela Adlon) - The French spy who works for Lieutenant Vronchy. She is able to sneak in and out mostly by seducing Uncle Gabby and Drinky Crow.
 Veteran Adult Swim voice actor George Lowe, played many background characters, but did not receive credit on any of the episodes.

Episodes

Pilot (2007)

Season 1 (2008–09)

International broadcast
In Canada, The Drinky Crow Show previously aired on G4's Adult Digital Distraction block, and on the Canadian version of Adult Swim.

Home media
All episodes, excluding the pilot, are available on iTunes. The entire series, including the pilot, has been made available for streaming on the official Adult Swim website.

References

External links
 
 
 The Original Maakies Comic and Tony Millionaire's Site

2000s American adult animated television series
2000s American black comedy television series
2008 American television series debuts
2009 American television series endings
American adult animated comedy television series
Adult Swim original programming
American adult computer-animated television series
Alcohol abuse in television
English-language television shows
Television series by Williams Street
Animated television series about birds
Television shows based on comic strips